The Devil's Point (Scottish Gaelic: Bod an Deamhain) is a mountain in the Cairngorms of Scotland, lying to the west of the Lairig Ghru pass. The Gaelic name means "Penis of the Demon". The English name is a result of a visit to the area by Queen Victoria. She asked her local ghillie, John Brown, to translate the name; to avoid embarrassment he gave a euphemistic answer.

The easiest route is to follow the path leading up the Coire Odhar from Corrour Bothy, on the eastern side of the mountain.

The Devil's Point is often climbed along with Cairn Toul. Sgòr an Lochain Uaine, which lies to the north of Cairn Toul is sometimes called The Angel's Peak, in contrast to The Devil's Point.

References

See also
 The Devil's Arse, Derbyshire, England

Munros
Devil's Point
Devil's Point
Places and place names on Mar Lodge Estate
One-thousanders of Scotland